Hindsight 21-20: Anthology 1975–1995 is an album by American singer-songwriter Guy Clark, released in 2007.

This compilation is the first multi-label anthology of Clark's career, issued by the Australian label Raven Records.

Track listing
All songs by Guy Clark unless otherwise noted.
 "L.A. Freeway" – 4:58
 "Rita Ballou" – 2:49
 "She Ain't Goin' Nowhere" – 3:29
 "Texas 1947" – 3:11
 "Desperados Waiting for the Train" – 4:32
 "Texas Cookin'" – 3:50
 "Broken Hearted People" – 4:44
 "The Last Gunfighter Ballad" – 2:51
 "Comfort and Crazy" – 3:07
 "The Houston Kid" – 4:00
 "New Cut Road" – 3:43
 "South Coast of Texas" – 3:48
 "Heartbroke" – 3:02"
 "She's Crazy For Leaving" (Clark, Rodney Crowell) – 2:55
 "Homegrown Tomatoes" – 2:59
 "The Randall Knife" [1983 version] – 4:11
 "No Deal" (Townes Van Zandt) – 3:20
 "Baton Rouge Clark, Crowley 2:48
 "Boats to Build" (Clark, Verlon Thompson) – 3:49
 "Dublin Blues" – 4:21
 "The Cape" (Guy Clark, Susanna Clark, J. Janosky) – 3:39

Personnel
Guy Clark – vocals, guitar

References

Guy Clark compilation albums
2007 compilation albums